The 1991–92 FIBA European Cup was the twenty-sixth edition of FIBA's 2nd-tier level European-wide professional club basketball competition.

Participants

First round

|}

Second round

|}

Third round
Wild card to participate in the European Cup for the Loser clubs* of the 1/16 finals of the 1991–92 FIBA European League.
*Śląsk Wrocław, Maccabi Rishon LeZion, KTP Kotka, Scania Södertälje, Vevey, Pezoporikos Larnaca, Fenerbahçe, Benfica and Szolnoki Olajbányász.

|}

Automatically qualified to the group stage
 PAOK (title holder)
 Real Madrid Asegurator
 Pau-Orthez

Quarterfinals round

Semifinals
Seeded teams played games 2 and 3 at home.

|}

Final
March 17, Palais des Sports de Beaulieu, Nantes

|}

See also

 1991-92 FIBA Euroleague
 1991-92 FIBA Korać Cup

External links
1991–92 FIBA European Cup @ FIBA Europe.com
1991–92 FIBA European Cup @ linguasport.com

FIBA Saporta Cup
FIBA